FEM or Fem may refer to:

Arts and entertainment
 Fem (magazine), a feminist magazine
 FEM (TV channel), a Norwegian television channel
 Fem, a special-interest news magazine published by University of California, Los Angeles Student Media

Organisations
 , French name for the European Materials Handling Federation
 Zimbabwe Airlink (ICAO code), a defunct airline

Science and technology
 Field emission microscopy, an analytical technique to investigate molecular surface structures
 Finite element machine, a parallel computer project by NASA
 Finite element method, a numerical technique for partial differential equations
 FEM Element, a commercial finite element method solver for electromagnetic structures from EEsof

People
 Ferdinand Marcos (1917-1989), sometimes abbreviated as FEM (Ferdinand E. Marcos)
 Fem Belling (born 1978), Australian jazz vocalist and violinist
 Fem van Empel (born 2002), Dutch racing cyclist

See also
 Fem unga, a Swedish anthology published in 1929 and the name of the literary group formed by the writers
 Femme (disambiguation)
 De Fem, a Swedish spiritualistic group
 FESEM (field emission scanning electron microscopy)